Enoggera may refer to:
 Enoggera, Queensland, a suburb of Brisbane, in Queensland, Australia
 Enoggera Barracks, an Australian Army base in the suburb
 Enoggera Hill, hill in the suburb
 Enoggera railway station, railway station in the suburb
 Enoggera Reservoir, Queensland, a suburb of Brisbane, in Queensland, Australia
 Enoggera Dam, a dam in the suburb
 Enoggera Creek, a creek in Queensland, Australia
 Enoggera Road, Brisbane, a road in Brisbane, Queensland, Australia
 Shire of Enoggera, a former local government area in Queensland, Australia
 Enoggera (wasp), a wasp genus in the family Pteromalidae